Vongchavalitkul University Nakhon Ratchasima part Football Club (Thai สโมสรฟุตบอลมหาวิทยาลัย วงษ์ชวลิตกุล วิทยาเขต นครราชสีมา), is a Thai Amateur football club based in Nakhon Ratchasima. The club was formed in 2010 and entered the Ngor Royal Cup.

Seasonal Record

P = Played
W = Games won
D = Games drawn
L = Games lost
F = Goals for
A = Goals against
Pts = Points
Pos = Final position

QR1 = First Qualifying Round
QR2 = Second Qualifying Round
R1 = Round 1
R2 = Round 2
R3 = Round 3
R4 = Round 4

R5 = Round 5
R6 = Round 6
QF = Quarter-finals
SF = Semi-finals
RU = Runners-up
W = Winners

Association football clubs established in 2010
Football clubs in Thailand
Sport in Nakhon Ratchasima province
2010 establishments in Thailand
University and college association football clubs